Jiangsu Phoenix is a Chinese professional women's basketball club based in Jiangsu, playing in the Women's Chinese Basketball Association (WCBA).

Season-by-season records

Current players

Notable former players

 Angel White (2002)
 Latasha Byears (2002)
 Denique Graves (2002)
 LaQuanda Barksdale (2002)
 Asjha Jones (2004–05)
 Ann Strother (2008)
 Adrian Williams-Strong (2008–09)
 Shyra Ely (2009–10)
 KeKe Carrier (2010–11)
 Erica Davis (2011)
 Amy Jaeschke (2011–12)
 Krystal Thomas (2012–13)
 Erlana Larkins (2013–14)
 Yelena Leuchanka (2014–15)
 Jessica Breland (2015–16)
 Viktoria Medvedeva (2017–18)
 Cheng Hui-yun (2004–05)
 Bian Lan (2002–09, 2014–15)
 Li Shanshan (2005–18)
 Zhang Xiaoni (2012–13)

References

External links
Jiangsu Phoenix - Asia-basket.com

Women's Chinese Basketball Association teams